Bartholomew Bunting (born 19 July 1976) is an Australian blind Paralympic alpine skier. He started skiing in 1998 with his guide Nathan Chivers. He won two gold medals and a silver medal with Chivers at the 2002 Salt Lake City Winter Paralympics and competed at the 2010 Vancouver Paralympics.

Personal
Bunting was born on 19 July 1976, and has been blind since birth. Bunting attended the secondary school Oakhill College. He has a degree in computer science from the University of Technology, Sydney. He was featured on the Australian Broadcasting Corporation's X Paralympic Games in March 2010. In 2022, Bunting was living in the New South Wales north coast town of Nimbin with his wife and two children. He works in information technology remotely.

Skiing
Bunting skied with his guide Nathan Chivers, whom he has known since high school. He began skiing in 1998 at a "tryout camp" for people with disabilities. He found it difficult at first, but in 2000, he won a gold medal in the downhill and giant slalom at the IPC Alpine Skiing World Championships in Anzère, Switzerland. From 2001 to 2003 and in 2009, he had an Australian Institute of Sport scholarship for alpine skiing.

Bunting won two gold medals at the 2002 Salt Lake City Games in the downhill B1–3 and super-G B1–3 events, and a silver medal in the giant slalom B1–2 event. Due to these achievements, he carried the Australian flag during the closing ceremony of the Games. Bunting and Chivers retired after 2002 due to Chivers breaking a leg in a motorbike accident. He returned to competition with Chivers in 2009 with the aim of competing at the 2010 Vancouver Games. He competed but did not win any medals at these games with Nathan Chivers as his guide. While he was scheduled to ski in the second run of the giant slalom at the 2010 Games, he withdrew from that competition to focus on the downhill event. He had been in 14th place after his first run. By June 2011, he had retired from elite skiing.

References

1976 births
Australian male alpine skiers
Alpine skiers at the 2002 Winter Paralympics
Alpine skiers at the 2010 Winter Paralympics
Paralympic alpine skiers of Australia
Medalists at the 2002 Winter Paralympics
Paralympic medalists in alpine skiing
Paralympic gold medalists for Australia
Paralympic silver medalists for Australia
Visually impaired category Paralympic competitors
Australian Institute of Sport Paralympic skiers
Skiers from Sydney
University of Technology Sydney alumni
Australian blind people
People educated at Oakhill College
Living people